John Robert French (May 28, 1819 – October 2, 1890) was an American publisher, editor and Republican politician. He served as a Congressional Representative from North Carolina, as Sergeant at Arms of the United States Senate and as a member of the North Carolina House of Representatives during the 1860s.

Early life and career
French was born in Gilmanton, New Hampshire and received an academic education in Gilmanton and Concord, New Hampshire. He learned the printer’s trade, and for five years worked as publisher and associate editor of the New Hampshire Statesman in Concord. In 1847, while at the New Hampshire Statesman, French published a volume of writings by Nathaniel Peabody Rogers titled, A Collection from the Newspaper Writings of Nathaniel Peabody Rogers. He was the publisher and associate editor of Herald of Freedom in Concord, one of the first anti-slavery newspapers.

He worked as editor of the Eastern Journal in Biddeford, Maine for two years. In 1854, French moved to Lake County, Ohio where he worked as editor of the Telegraph, the Press, and, in 1856, the Cleveland Morning Leader.

Political career
In 1858 and 1859, French served as a member of the Ohio House of Representatives. In 1861, he was appointed by Secretary Salmon P. Chase to a clerkship in the Treasury Department in Washington, D.C.

French was appointed by President Abraham Lincoln as a member of the board of direct-tax commissioners for the State of North Carolina.  He settled in Edenton, North Carolina at the close of the Civil War. In 1867, he served as a Delegate to the State constitutional convention.

Upon the readmission of the State of North Carolina to representation following the Civil War, French was elected as a Republican to the Fortieth Congress, serving from July 6, 1868 to March 3, 1869. He was not a candidate for renomination in 1868.

He was elected Sergeant at Arms of the United States Senate on March 22, 1869 and served in that capacity until March 24, 1879. French was appointed secretary and disbursing office of the Ute Commission in July 1880, whereupon he returned to Washington, D.C.

In his later years, French moved to Omaha, Nebraska, and then to Boise City, Idaho, where he was editor of the Boise City Sun until his death. He is interred in Boise City Cemetery.

Personal life
French was Nathaniel Peabody Rogers's son in law.

References

External links 
 
 Senate website biography
 

1819 births
1890 deaths
People from Gilmanton, New Hampshire
Politicians from Concord, New Hampshire
People from Lake County, Ohio
People from Edenton, North Carolina
People from Washington, D.C.
Politicians from Omaha, Nebraska
People from Boise, Idaho
American newspaper editors
American newspaper publishers (people)
Members of the Ohio House of Representatives
Sergeants at Arms of the United States Senate
Republican Party members of the United States House of Representatives from North Carolina
19th-century American journalists
American male journalists
19th-century American male writers
19th-century American politicians
Journalists from Ohio
19th-century American businesspeople